Miloš Vesić (Serbian Cyrillic: Милош Весић; born 23 July 1989) is a Serbian professional footballer, whose position is goalkeeper. He plays for GFK Jagodina.

Club career

Red Star Belgrade
In July 2011, Vesić moved to Red Star Belgrade. He made his league debut for the club over two years after signing, on 26 May 2013 in a 3-0 away defeat to FK Vojvodina. He played all ninety minutes of the match.

Radnički Kragujevac
In July 2014, Vesić moved to Radnički Kragujevac on a free transfer. He made his league debut for the club on 18 October 2014 in a 4-1 away defeat to FK Čukarički. He played all ninety minutes of the match. He was released in July 2015 after making only two appearances during his one-year spell.

Dinamo Vranje
After over a year being unattached, Vesić was picked up by Serbian First League club FK Dinamo Vranje. He made his league debut for the club on 9 October 2016 in a 2-1 home defeat to FK Budućnost Dobanovci. He played all ninety minutes of the match.

Proleter Novi Sad
In March 2018, Vesić moved to FK Proleter Novi Sad. He made his league debut for the club on 11 March 2018 in a 1-0 home victory over FK Sloboda Užice. He played all ninety minute of the match.

Honours
Red Star
Serbian SuperLiga (1): 2013–14
Serbian Cup (1): 2011–12
Proleter Novi Sad
Serbian First League (1): 2017–18

References

External links
 
 Miloš Vesić stats at Utakmica.rs 
 

1989 births
Living people
People from Temerin
Association football goalkeepers
Serbian footballers
RFK Novi Sad 1921 players
Red Star Belgrade footballers
FK Radnički 1923 players
FK Dinamo Vranje players
FK Proleter Novi Sad players
FK Dinamo Pančevo players
Serbian First League players
Serbian SuperLiga players